Oken is a surname. Notable people
with the surname include:

Lorenz Oken (originally Okenfuß) (1779–1851), German naturalist, botanist, biologist, and ornithologist
46563 Oken, a main-belt asteroid
Oken (crater), a lunar crater
Steven Oken (1962–2004), American convicted murderer